A Boy, a Girl and a Bike is a 1949 British romantic comedy film directed by Ralph Smart and starring John McCallum, Honor Blackman and Patrick Holt. The film's art direction was by George Provis. The film concerns the romantic escapades and adventures of a Yorkshire cycling club.

Plot
Young couple Sue (Honor Blackman) and Sam (Patrick Holt) are members of a Yorkshire cycling club, the ‘Wakeford Wheelers’. Romantic complications ensue when wealthy David (John McCallum) becomes smitten with Sue, and joins the club to pursue her, much to Sam's dismay.

The film is set in Wakeford and in the Yorkshire Dales. It features cycle sabotage and cycling tactics.

Cast
 John McCallum as David Howarth 
 Honor Blackman as Susie Bates 
 Patrick Holt as Sam Walters
 Diana Dors as Ada Foster 
 Maurice Denham as Bill Martin 
 Leslie Dwyer as Steve Hall 
 Anthony Newley as Charlie Ritchie 
 Megs Jenkins as Nan Ritchie 
 John Blythe as Frank Martin 
 Hal Osmond as Mr. Bates 
 Thora Hird as Mrs. Bates
 Amy Veness as Grandma Bates 
 Maggie Hanley as Ginger 
 Cyril Chamberlain as Bert Gardner 
 Barry Letts as Syd
 Vera Cook as Helen Gardner 
 Julien Mitchell as Mr. Howarth
 Alison Leggatt as Mrs. Howarth 
 Lyn Evans as Policeman in Cafe 
 Margot Bourke as Mary Bates 
 Geoffrey Best as Harry 
 John Howlett as Alf Pearson 
 Patrick Halstead as Willie 
 Joan Seton as Beryl Howarth 
 Dennis Peck as Norman Bates 
 Vera Williams as Jill Bates
 Bernard Hepton as Cyclist 
 Gerald Lawson as Dog Seller
 Barbara Murray
 Valerie Pearson as Cyclist
 Charles Saynor as Policeman 
 Marianne Stone
 Ben Williams as New Houseowner

Production
The film was based on an original idea by Sydney Box, who was head of production at Gainsborough. Box came up with the idea while out for a Sunday drive, and gave the job of writing the script to Ted Willis, who had worked for Box on the scripts for Holiday Camp and The Huggett's Abroad. Willis had the reputation of someone who could write for working class characters. The film was originally called Wheels within Wheels

Richard Attenborough was meant to play a key role but was held up making The Guinea Pig; Patrick Holt played his part instead.

In March 1948 Smart was scouting locations in Yorkshire. Filming took place in September 1948. It happened on location in Yorkshire at places including Wakefield, Hebden Bridge, Skipton and at Gainsborough's studio in Shepherd's Bush.

Critical reception
Variety called it "feeble... valueless for the US market."

The Monthly Film Bulletin called it a "simple unpretentious story enlivened by flashes of homely Yorkshire humour."

The Radio Times gave the film two out of five stars, calling it, "A minor, good-natured British comedy romance."

References

Bibliography
 Spicer, Andrew. Sydney Box. Manchester University Press, 2006.

External links
 
A Boy a Girl and a Bike at BFI
A Boy a Girl and a Bike at Letterbox DVD

1949 films
British romantic comedy-drama films
Films set in Yorkshire
Gainsborough Pictures films
Islington Studios films
Films shot in England
Films directed by Ralph Smart
British black-and-white films
1940s romantic comedy-drama films
Films with screenplays by Ted Willis, Baron Willis
1940s English-language films
1940s British films